Dominik Balić (born 4 May 1996) is a Croatian footballer who plays as a defender and also as a midfielder for NK Dugopolje.

References

External links

1996 births
Living people
Footballers from Split, Croatia
Association football midfielders
Croatian footballers
NK Dugopolje players
Melaka United F.C. players
First Football League (Croatia) players
Malaysia Super League players
Croatian expatriate footballers
Expatriate footballers in Malaysia
Croatian expatriate sportspeople in Malaysia